The Second Album is the second studio album by Latyrx, an American hip hop duo consisting of Lateef the Truthspeaker and Lyrics Born. It was released via Latyramid on November 5, 2013. It includes productions from Jel, Amp Live, and Tune-Yards, among others. The album peaked at number 34 on the Billboard Heatseekers Albums chart.

Critical reception

At Metacritic, which assigns a weighted average score out of 100 to reviews from mainstream critics, The Second Album received an average score of 63, based on 5 reviews, indicating "generally favorable reviews".

Mike Powell of Rolling Stone gave the album 3 stars out of 5, saying, "Their second album isn't as radically unusual as its well-regarded predecessor, but the template remains the same: eclectic without getting wacky, thoughtful without getting preachy, full of great wordplay over beats that tie hip-hop to a history of all-purpose head-nod music from funk to electro and beyond." Nate Patrin of Pitchfork gave the album a 4.8 out of 10, calling it "scattered and frantic."

Track listing

Charts

References

External links
 
 

2013 albums
Latyrx albums
Albums produced by Jel (music producer)